Cefcapene (INN) is a third-generation cephalosporin antibiotic.

It was patented in 1985 and approved for medical use in 1997.

References

Cephalosporin antibiotics
Thiazoles